Jeannie Thib (1955–2013) was a Canadian artist, sculptor and printmaker.

Biography
Thib was born in North Bay, Ontario in 1955 and obtained a Bachelor of Fine Arts at York University in Toronto in 1979. Inspired by her experiences in the wilderness of Northern Ontario, her work included ornamented sculptures, installations and prints. Thib exhibited in Canada, the U.S., Europe and Australia, and she was commercially represented by the Leo Kamen Gallery, the Katzman and Joan Ferneyhough galleries. In 2008 an exhibition catalogue of her work with essays by Patrick Mahon and Suzanne Danis Légé was co-published by the Koffler Centre of the Arts and Foreman Art Gallery of Bishop's University.

Thib died in 2013 at the age of 58, after battling cancer for five years. She was survived by her partner Bruce Holland. The Katzman Gallery hosted a memorial exhibition, Imprint, in February 2014.

Exhibitions
Manual 1, 3 and 4 by Jeannie Thib, National Gallery of Canada, Ottawa, 1998
Lure, Koffler Gallery, Koffler Centre of the Arts, Toronto, 2004 
Cache, Lake Nipissing, 2008
Moon Transit, St. Clair Streetcar Line, Toronto, 2010

Collections
Thib's work is included in the collection of the National Gallery of Canada.

References

1955 births
2013 deaths
Artists from Ontario
People from North Bay, Ontario
York University alumni
Canadian printmakers
Canadian sculptors
Women printmakers
Canadian women sculptors
20th-century Canadian women artists
20th-century Canadian artists
20th-century sculptors
21st-century Canadian women artists
21st-century Canadian artists
21st-century sculptors
20th-century printmakers